Sir Thomas Colby, 1st Baronet ( – 23 September 1729) was an English politician who sat in the House of Commons from 1724 to 1727.

Colby was the son of Philip Colby (1638–92) of Colby House and his wife Elizabeth Flewellin, daughter of William Flewellin. His father became rich in the last years of his life by supplying a considerable amount of clothing to the army of William III.  Colby took up residence in Colby house which was rebuilt, most probably around 1713. On 21 June 1720, he was created a baronet, of Kensington in the County of Middlesex. He earned  a reputation for great wealth, invested mainly in stocks and was cited as an example of avarice by William King, a Jacobite don and satirist.

Colby was Navy Commissioner, and sat as Member of Parliament for Rochester from 1724 to 1727.

Colby died a bachelor in September 1729. According to King his death was caused when he got up in the middle of the night in a heavy sweat because he was worried the servants may steal a bottle of port as he had left the key lying around. The baronetcy became extinct on his death. He was buried with great  pomp in the family vault in the parish church. It was thought that he died intestate and there was great controversy about his estate, which was said to be near £200,000. He had in fact drafted a will bequeathing his house and property in Kensington to his "Kinsman and namesake Thomas Colby late Clerke of the Cheque of His Majesty's Yard at Portsmouth", but failed to sign or date it. That will was  therefore ignored and administration of the estate was granted to his cousin Flewellin Apsley, to be divided among his heirs.

References

1670 births
1729 deaths
British MPs 1722–1727
Members of the Parliament of Great Britain for English constituencies
Baronets in the Baronetage of Great Britain